"Teeth" is a song by Australian pop rock band 5 Seconds of Summer, released on 21 August 2019 as the second single from the band's fourth studio album Calm. It also appears on the third season soundtrack of the Netflix series 13 Reasons Why. Written by band members Luke Hemmings and Ashton Irwin with Ali Tamposi, and produced by Andrew Watt and Louis Bell, the track features guitar from Tom Morello of Rage Against the Machine, and its music video was released the same day. The track's instrumental samples "So What", an unreleased song by late American rapper Juice Wrld and also produced by Bell and Watt, which was recorded in 2018 during the sessions for Wrld on Drugs, Juice Wrld's collaborative mixtape with American rapper Future.

Similarly to the band's previous single "Easier", an alternate "Live from the Vault" version of the song was released. "Teeth – Live from the Vault" was released on 29 October 2019 and was accompanied by a video directed by Thibaut Duverneix.

At the APRA Music Awards of 2020, "Teeth" was nominated for Song of the Year, while it won Song of the Year at the 2020 ARIA Music Awards.

Promotion
The song was announced on the band's social media on 16 August 2019, along with a 15-second teaser that Alternative Press called "ominous". The song was used as the official theme song for WWE Survivor Series 2019 in addition to appearing in ESPN's 2019 Saturday Night Football season.

Critical reception
Billboard wrote that the song "sees the group venturing even further into the industrial sounds and themes the band began to explore with previous release 'Easier'". Rolling Stone described the song as "industrial pop" and noted that it "culls from the same well of brooding, ominous industrial rock and nu-metal that inspired their Nine Inch Nails-inspired 'Easier.'"

Music video
The music video, directed by Thibaut Duverneix and also released on 21 August 2019, features the band "subjected to an experiment-gone-wrong resulting in each member's personal hellscape", and was called "dark" and "creepy" by Rolling Stone. It starts with the 4 members in what seems to be like a dentist's office. In their dreams, the members successfully escape their hellscape. Luke is in a foggy room, Ashton is in a room where the walls are made of linen blown by a big fan, Calum tries to pull a big brick using chains, and Michael climbs a tall ladder. As of 10 June 2022, it has more than 130 million views.

Live performances 
The song was performed live for the first time on 11 September 2019 as part of the band's stripped back show at 97.1 AMP Radio's SoCal Honda Sound Stage Pop Up. The next day, on 12 September 2019, it was performed on The Late Late Show with James Corden. The song was also performed live on A Little Late with Lilly Singh and was part of the band's setlist for the World War Joy Tour.

On 7 October 2019, the song was performed on ESPN Monday Night Football Genesis Halftime Show, with the accompanying performance video being released the same day.

Charts

Weekly charts

Year-end charts

Certifications

Release history

References

2019 singles
2019 songs
5 Seconds of Summer songs
ARIA Award-winning songs
Industrial songs
Interscope Records singles
Songs from television series
Songs written by Ali Tamposi
Songs written by Andrew Watt (record producer)
Songs written by Ashton Irwin
Songs written by Bernard Sumner
Songs written by Carl Sturken and Evan Rogers
Songs written by Gillian Gilbert
Songs written by Louis Bell
Songs written by Luke Hemmings
Songs written by Peter Hook
Songs written by Ryan Tedder
Songs written by Stephen Morris (musician)